Jorge Eduardo Franco Jiménez (born 6 December 1943) is a Mexican politician affiliated with the Institutional Revolutionary Party. He served as Senator of the LIX Legislature of the Mexican Congress representing Oaxaca as replacement of Ulises Ruiz Ortiz. He previously served as attorney general of the state of Oaxaca from 1998 to 2004.

References

1943 births
Living people
People from Oaxaca City
Members of the Senate of the Republic (Mexico)
Institutional Revolutionary Party politicians
Politicians from Oaxaca
Mexican prosecutors
20th-century Mexican lawyers
21st-century Mexican lawyers